Lamidanda may refer to the following places in Nepal:

 Lamidanda, Khotang
 Lamidanda, Dolakha
 Lamidanda in Kavrepalanchok District, a stop on the Araniko Highway